Adelphostigma quadriocellata is a species of snake in the family Colubridae. It is found in Brazil. It is oviparous.

References 

Adelphostigma
Reptiles described in 2008
Snakes of South America
Reptiles of Brazil